= Ojie Eugene Inegbeboh =

Nigerian politician and Member edo state house of assembly

Member of the Edo State House of Assembly
- Incumbent
- Assumed office June 2023
- Preceded by: Ephraim Aluebhosele
- Constituency: Igueben

Deputy Majority Leader of the Edo State House of Assembly
- Incumbent
- Assumed office August 2026

Minority Whip of the Edo State House of Assembly
- In office May 2025 – July 2025

Personal details
- Born: 15 June Edo State, Nigeria
- Party: All Progressives Congress (2025–present)
- Other political affiliations: Peoples Democratic Party (until 2025)
- Education: Nigerian Law School
- Occupation: Legal practitioner, politician
- Profession: Lawyer

Ojie Eugene Inegbeboh is a Nigerian legal practitioner and politician serving as a member of the Edo State House of Assembly representing the Igueben constituency.

== Early life and career ==
Inegbeboh hails from Edo State, Nigeria. He studied law and was called to the Nigerian Bar, practicing prior to his election to public office.

== Political career ==
In March 2023, Inegbeboh was elected to the Edo State House of Assembly to represent the Igueben constituency on the platform of the Peoples Democratic Party (PDP).

In May 2025, Inegbeboh was appointed Minority Whip of the Edo State House of Assembly. In July 2025, he left the PDP and defected to the All Progressives Congress (APC).

In August 2026, he became the Deputy Majority Leader of the assembly. He has held committee roles, including Chairman of the House Committee on Transport, Chairman of the Committee on Ethics and Privileges, and member of an ad-hoc committee appointed to review state infrastructure projects.

== Legislative activities ==
Inegbeboh serve as Transport Committee Chairman.
